George Plafker is an American geologist and seismologist who has made significant contributions to both fields, with research focused on subduction, tsunami, and the geology of Alaska. Following prolonged study of the region of the 1964 Alaska earthquake, Plafker correctly concluded that the largest earthquakes are the result of fault slip at convergent boundaries. This was at a time when the theory of plate tectonics was still not completely accepted by the scientific community. Additional studies were done in Chile in the late 1960s regarding the series of earthquakes there.

Awards
For his groundbreaking research, Plafker was honored with the Penrose Medal by the Geological Society of America and the Harry Fielding Reid Medal from the Seismological Society of America, both in 2017.

References

External links
 Biographical Sketch for: George Plafker – IRIS Consortium
 50 Years Ago, Alaskan Earthquake Was Key Event for Earth Science – KQED

Living people
American geologists
Stanford University alumni
American seismologists
1929 births
People from Delaware County, Pennsylvania
Brooklyn College alumni
United States Geological Survey personnel
University of California, Berkeley alumni
Penrose Medal winners